Adam Boyle may refer to:

 Adam Boyle (active 2011), British motorcyclist who competed in the 2011 National Superstock 600 Championship season
 Adam Boyle (active 201213), Scottish footballer playing for Cambuslang Rangers F.C.

See also 
 Adam Boyle, title character of the song "Adam Boyle Has Cast Lad Rock Aside" on the 2014 album Urge for Offal by the band Half Man Half Biscuit
 Boyle for other people with the same surname